Graphium phidias  is a species of butterfly in the family Papilionidae (swallowtails). It is found in Laos and Vietnam.

Status
It is recorded from only a small area and very little information is available about it.

References

External links
Indochina butterflies Images, data
External image

phidias
Butterflies of Indochina
Butterflies described in 1906